C. Saunders was a South African cricket umpire. He stood in one Test match, South Africa vs. England, in 1928.

See also
 List of Test cricket umpires

References

Year of birth missing
Year of death missing
Place of death missing
South African Test cricket umpires